The International Seven Metre Class is a construction class, meaning that the boats are not identical but are all designed to meet specific measurement formula, in this case International Rule.  At their heyday, Metre Classes were the most important group of international yacht racing classes, and they are still actively raced around the world. "Seven" in class name does not, somewhat confusingly, refer to length of the boat, but product of the formula; 7mR boats are, on average, 13 meters long.

History 
The 7mR was used as an Olympic Class during the 1908 and 1920 Olympics. 
The International Rule was set up in 1907 to replace earlier, simpler handicap system which were often local or at best, national, and often also fairly simple, producing extreme boats which were fast but lightly constructed and impractical. The rule changes several times in history. About 200 boats were ever built.

Rule development

1907 Rule 

Used from 1907–31.12.1917

where
  = waterline length (LWL)
  = beam
  = chain girth
  = difference between girth and chain
  = sail area
  = freeboard

1919 Rule 
Used from 1920–1933.

where
  = waterline length (LWL)
  = chain girth
  = difference between girth and chain
  = sail area
  = freeboard

Olympic results

References

 

 
Keelboats
Olympic sailing classes
Development sailing classes